The BM-27 Uragan (GRAU index 9P140) is a self-propelled 220 mm multiple rocket launcher designed in the Soviet Union to deliver cluster munitions. The system began its service with the Soviet Army in the late 1970s, and was its first spin and fin stabilized heavy multiple rocket launcher.

An updated version known as Uragan-1M was commissioned in 2008. The truck vehicle has no similarities.

Description
The BM-27 Uragan is capable of launching 220 mm rockets from 16 launch tubes mounted on the rear of a ZIL-135 8×8 chassis. This vehicle is extremely similar to that used in the FROG-7 free flight rocket system. It has two gasoline engines that power its 20 tonnes to a maximum speed of 65 kilometers per hour. One engine drives the four wheels on the left of the truck, while the other engine drives the four wheels on the right. The ZIL-135 has eight wheel drive, but only the front and rear axles are used for steering. It has a maximum cruising range of 500 kilometers.

The cab of the ZIL-135 is NBC protected, allowing the rockets to be fired without exposing the crew to possible contaminants. The six-man crew can emplace or displace the system in three minutes.

Before firing, stabilizing jacks must be lowered and the blast shield raised to protect the cab and its occupants. Indirect fire aiming is achieved with the use of a PG-1 panoramic telescope. Although there are no night vision sights, the driver of the launch vehicle is equipped with a night vision device.

The BM-27 can use HE-FRAG, chemical, explosive or scatterable mine (PTM-3 or PFM-1) submunition equipped rockets, all of which are detonated by electric timing fuses. (However, chemical munitions have been officially off service in Russia since 2017.) Each rocket weighs 280.4 kilograms. The warheads weigh between 90 and 100 kilograms, depending on type. A full salvo of 16 rockets can be fired in 20 seconds and can engage targets within a range of 35 kilometers.

Because of the size of the warhead, the range of the rocket and the speed that a salvo can be delivered, the BM-27 is very effective at mine laying. Each 220 mm rocket can scatter 312 anti-personnel PFM-1 mines. Minefields can be laid behind a retreating enemy or even be used to trap an enemy by encircling them with mines. Tactics such as this were often used by the Soviets in Afghanistan.

Once the rockets have been fired, 9T452 (another ZIL-135 based vehicle) is used to assist in reloading. It carries additional rockets and a crane to transfer the rockets from the reload vehicle to the launcher. The entire reloading procedure takes around 20 minutes.

Rockets

Also 9M27S incendiary rockets.

Variants
 9P140 Uragan: Standard variant on ZIL-135 truck.

Uragan-M

 : Variant presented to the public in 2007; all processes are automated. Can also fire the 300 mm rockets of the BM-30 Smerch system. Reloading is simplified by substituting barrels; can be fitted with two banks of six 300 mm launch tubes or 15 220 mm launch tubes. Deliveries to the Russian Army started as of September 2016. On Belarusian MZKT 8x8 military truck chassis.

Uragan-U
 : Successor with 2 × 15 launch tubes; presented in 2009 on 8×8 MZKT-7930. Thanks to its modular assembly the BM-30 Smerch and BM-21 Grad rockets can also be fired.

Ukrainian models
 Bastion-03: Prototype by Ukrainian company AvtoKrAZ, presented in 2010. Installed on a 6×6 truck type KrAZ-63221RA.
 Bureviy (meaning "Storm"): Prototype by Ukroboronprom involving a new digital fire control system capable of target sharing and mounted on a Tatra 8x8 T815-7T3RC1 chassis, which can fire with modified armament up to 65 km (40 mi).

Operators

 – 18 (not functional)
 – some BM-27 ordered in 2011

 – 72 
 – 9 
 – 3 
 – Saw limited usage during Abkhazia War, out of service.
 – Unknown
 – 180 
 – 6 
 – 11 
 – unknown
 – unknown
 – 200 in service and 700 in storage 

 – 12
 – 48
 – 60 
 – 70 
 – 48 
 – Over 50. Seen intensive action in the ongoing civil war.

See also 
 Astros II MLRS
 BM-24 240 mm multiple rocket launcher
 BM-30 Smerch 300 mm heavy multiple rocket launcher
 Fajr-5 333 mm rocket launcher
 Falaq-2 Unguided rocket launcher
 M142 HIMARS
 Katyusha BM-13 multiple rocket launchers of World War II
 MAR-290 heavy multiple rocket launcher
 MLRS M270 227 mm multiple rocket launcher
 Pinaka multi barrel rocket launcher 122 mm / 214 mm multiple rocket launcher
 TOROS 230–260 mm rocket launcher
 9A52-4 Tornado 122 mm / 220 mm / 300 mm universal multiple launch rocket system

References

Bibliography

External links

 Splav State Research and Production Enterprise
 Photo gallery at Armyrecognition.com 

Cold War artillery of the Soviet Union
Multiple rocket launchers of the Soviet Union
Self-propelled artillery of Russia
NPO Splav products
Cluster munition
Military vehicles introduced in the 1970s
Wheeled self-propelled rocket launchers